Phoenicus or Phoinikous  may refer to:

Places
Phoenicus (Cythera), a town of ancient Cythera, Greece
Phoenicus (Ionia), a town of ancient Ionia, now in Turkey
Phoenicus (Lycia), a town of ancient Lycia, now in Turkey
Phoenicus (Messenia), a town of ancient Messenia, Greece
Finike, modern Turkish town near the site of the Lycian Phoenicus

Other uses
Phoenicus (beetle), a genus of beetle

See also

 
 Phoenician (disambiguation)
 Phoenicia (disambiguation)
 Phoenix (disambiguation)